() is the largest village and administrative centre of Porsanger Municipality in Troms og Finnmark county, Norway. The village lies at the southern end of the large Porsangerfjorden.

There are a number of shops and supermarkets in Lakselv, as well as private and public sector services that cater for the village and its surrounding settlements.  Lakselv Church is located in the center part of the village.

Transportation
The European route E6 highway runs through the village.  Lakselv Airport, Banak is located in Lakselv on the Banak peninsula.  The airport has connections to Tromsø, Alta and Kirkenes operated by Widerøe, as well as charter flights in the summer season.

Activities
The area is popular for salmon, trout, Arctic char, and grayling fishing throughout the summer months in the Lakselva river which runs through the village. There are also great hiking opportunities in the surrounding arctic wilderness, including in Stabbursdalen National Park just west of the village.

During the winter, skiing, snowmobile safaris, ice fishing, and dog sledding are popular activities.

Notable people
 Lars Iver Strand, a Norwegian footballer who plays for Sandefjord Fotball

References

External links

The official website of Porsanger (only in Norwegian and Sami language)
Tourist information and activities

Villages in Finnmark
Porsanger
Populated places of Arctic Norway